Craig Reynolds may refer to:
Craig Reynolds (actor) (1907–1949), American film actor
Craig Reynolds (American football) (born 1996), American football player
Craig Reynolds (baseball) (born 1952), baseball player
Craig Reynolds (computer graphics) (born 1953), computer graphics artist
Craig Reynolds (soccer) (born 1953), retired American soccer defender